Kevin Baddeley (born 12 March 1962) is an English former football full back.

He began his footballing career as an apprentice with Bristol City, he progressed into the first team in 1980 and signed a professional contract with the club. He was given a free transfer to Swindon Town in June 1981 and went on to make over 110 appearances in league and cup games for the team.

Swindon released him in May 1985 following Lou Macari's appointment as team manager and he signed to Cheltenham Town. Later in his career he played for Wealdstone.

External links
Bristol City player profile
Swindon Town player profile

Living people
1962 births
Bristol City F.C. players
Swindon Town F.C. players
Cheltenham Town F.C. players
Wealdstone F.C. players
National League (English football) players
Association football defenders
English footballers